Non-formal learning includes various structured learning situations which do not either have the level of curriculum, syllabus, accreditation and certification associated with 'formal learning', but have more structure than that associated with 'informal learning', which typically take place naturally and spontaneously as part of other activities. These form the three styles of learning recognised and supported by the OECD.

Examples of non-formal learning include swimming sessions for toddlers, community-based sports programs, and programs developed by organisations such as the Boy Scouts, the Girl Guides, community or non-credit adult education courses, sports or fitness programs, professional conference style seminars, and continuing professional development. The learner's objectives may be to increase skills and knowledge, as well as to experience the emotional rewards associated with increased love for a subject or increased passion for learning.

History
The debate over the relative value of formal and informal learning has existed for a number of years. Traditionally formal learning takes place in a school or university and has a greater value placed upon it than informal learning, such as learning within the workplace. This concept of formal learning being the socio-cultural accepted norm for learning was first challenged by Scribner and Cole in 1973, who claimed most things in life are better learnt through informal processes, citing language learning as an example. Moreover, anthropologists noted that complex learning still takes place within indigenous communities that had no formal educational institutions.

It is the acquisition of this knowledge or learning which occurs in everyday life that has not been fully valued or understood. This led to the declaration by the OECD educational ministers of the "life-long learning for all" strategy in 1996. This includes 23 countries from five continents, who have sought to clarify and validate all forms of learning including formal, non-formal and informal. This has been in conjunction with the European Union which has also developed policies for life-long learning which focus strongly on the need to identify, assess and certify non-formal and informal learning, particularly in the workplace.

Characteristics 
 Learning may take place in a variety of locations.
 Relevance to the needs of disadvantaged groups
 Concern with specific categories of person.
 A Focus on clearly defined purpose
 Flexibility in organisation and methods

Goals/objectives 

 Provides functional literacy and continuing education for adults and youths who have not had a formal education or did not complete their primary education.
 Provide functional and remedial education for the young people who did not complete their secondary education.
 Provide education to different categories of graduates to improve the basic knowledge and skills.
 Provide in-service, on-the-job, vocational and professional training to different categories of workers and professionals to improve their skills.
 Give adult citizens of different parts of the country necessary aesthetic, cultural and civic education for public enlightenment.
 
Countries involved in recognition of non-formal learning (OECD 2010)

Formal and informal learning

Although all definitions can be contested (see below) this article shall refer to the European Centre for the Development of Vocational Training (Cedefop) 2001 communication on 'lifelong learning: formal, non-formal and informal learning' as the guideline for the differing definitions.

Formal learning: learning typically provided by an education or training institution, structured (in terms of learning objectives, learning time or learning support) and leading to certification. Formal learning is intentional from the learner's perspective. (Cedefop 2001)

Informal learning: learning resulting from daily life activities related to work, family or leisure. It is not structured (in terms of learning objectives, learning time or learning support) and typically does not lead to certification. Informal learning may be intentional but in most cases it is not-intentional (or "incidental"/random). (Cedefop 2001)

Non-formal learning: see definition above.

Contested definitions
If there is no clear distinction between formal and in-formal learning where is the room for non-formal learning. It is a contested issue with numerous definitions given. The following are some the competing theories.

"It is difficult to make a clear distinction between formal and informal learning as there is often a crossover between the two." (McGivney, 1999, p1).

Similarly, Hodkinson et al. (2003), conclude after a significant literature analysis on the topics of formal, informal, and non-formal learning, that "the terms informal and non-formal appeared interchangeable, each being primarily defined in opposition to the dominant formal education system, and the largely individualist and acquisitional conceptualisations of learning developed in relation to such educational contexts." (Hodkinson et al., 2003, p. 314) Moreover, he states that "It is important not to see informal and formal attributes as somehow separate, waiting to be integrated. This is the dominant view in the literature, and it is mistaken. Thus, the challenge is not to, somehow, combine informal and formal learning, for informal and formal attributes are present and inter-related, whether we will it so or not. The challenge is to recognise and identify them, and understand the implications. For this reason, the concept of non-formal learning, at least when seen as a middle state between formal and informal, is redundant." (p. 314)

Eraut's classification of learning into formal and non-formal:

This removes informal learning from the equation and states all learning outside of formal learning is non-formal. Eraut equates informal with connotations of dress, language or behaviour that have no relation to learning. Eraut defines formal learning as taking place within a learning framework; within a classroom or learning institution, with a designated teacher or trainer; the award of a qualification or credit; the external specification of outcomes. Any learning that occurs outside of these parameters is non-formal. (Ined 2002)

The EC (2001) Communication on Lifelong Learning: formal, non-formal and informal learning:

The EU places non-formal learning in between formal and informal learning (see above). This has learning both in a formal setting with a learning framework and as an organised event but within a qualification. "Non-formal learning: learning that is not provided by an education or training institution and typically does not lead to certification. It is, however, structured (in terms of learning objectives, learning time or learning support). Non-formal learning is intentional from the learner's perspective." (Cedefop 2001)

Livingstone's adults formal and informal education, non-formal and informal learning:

This focuses on the idea of adult non-formal education. This new mode, 'informal education' is when teachers or mentors guide learners without reference to structured learning outcomes. This informal education learning is gaining knowledge without an imposed framework, such as learning new job skills. (Infed, 2002)

Billett (2001): there is no such thing as informal learning:

Billett's definition states there is no such thing as non-formal and informal learning. He states all human activity is learning, and that everything people do involves a process of learning. "all learning takes place within social organisations or communities that have formalised structures." Moreover, he states most learning in life takes place outside of formal education.(Ined 2002)

The council of Europe puts the distinction in terms of willingness and the systems on which its taking place. Non formal learning takes place outside learning institutions while informal is a part of the formal systems.

Validation

Recently, many international organizations and UNESCO Member States have emphasized the importance of learning that takes place outside of formal learning settings. This emphasis has led UNESCO, through its Institute of Lifelong Learning (UIL), to adopt international guidelines for the Recognition, Validation and Accreditation of the Outcomes of Non-formal and Informal Learning in 2012. The emphasis has also led to an increasing number of policies and programmes in many Member States, and a gradual shift from pilots to large-scale systems such as those in Portugal, France, Australia, Mauritius and South Africa.

Cedefop has created European guidelines to provide validation to a broad range of learning experiences, thereby aiding transparency and comparability across its national borders. The broad framework for achieving this certification across both non-formal and informal learning is outlined in the Cedefop European guidelines for validating non-formal and informal learning; Routes from learning to certification.

Different countries' approaches

There are different approaches to validation between OCED and EU countries, with countries adopting different measures. The EU, as noted above, through the Cedefop-released European guidelines for validating non-formal and informal learning in 2009 to standardise validation throughout the EU. Within the OCED countries, the picture is more mixed.

Countries with the existence of recognition for non-formal and informal learning (Feutrie, 2007)

Flexible schooling or participatory schooling 

Non-formal education (NFE) is popular on a worldwide scale in both 'western' and 'developing countries'. Non-formal education can form a matrix with formal and non-formal education, as non-formal education can mean any form of systematic learning conducted outside the formal setting. Many courses in relation to non-formal education have been introduced in several universities in western and developing countries.

The UNESCO institute of education conducted a seminar on non-formal education in Morocco. The association for development of education in Africa (ADEA) launched many programmes in non-formal education in at least 15 countries of Sub-Saharan Africa. In 2001 World Bank conducted an international seminar on basic education in non-formal programmes. In addition to this the World Bank was advised to extend its services to adult and non-formal education.

A report on vocational education, Making Learning Visible: the identification, assessment and recognition of non-formal learning in Europe, defines non-formal learning as semi structured, consisting of planned and explicit approaches to learning introduced into work organisations and elsewhere, not recognised within the formal education and training system.

Types 

Several classifications of non-formal education have been proposed. Willems and Andersson classify non-formal education according to two dimensions: (1) "NFE in relation to formal and informal learning (Substitute-Complement)" and (2) "Main learning content of NFE (Competencies-Values)". Based on these two dimensions, they describe four types of non-formal education. The goal of their framework is to better understand the various public governance challenges and structures that very different types of non-formal education have. Similarly, Shrestha and colleagues focus on the role of NFE in comparison to formal education. Hoppers proposes a three-fold classification, also in comparison to formal education: "A. Supplementary provisions", "B. Compensatory provisions", and "C. Alternative provisions". Rogers pinpoints to the changing role of NFE over the last five decades and makes a distinction between a first and a second generation NFE.

Community work, which is particularly widespread in Scotland, fosters people's commitment to their neighbours and encourages participation in and development of local democratic forms of organisation.

Youth work which focuses on making people more active in the society.

Social work which helps young people in homes to develop ways to deal with complex situations like fostering fruitful relationships between parents and children, bringing different groups of career together, etc...

In France and Italy animation in a particular form is a kind of non-formal education. It uses theatre and acting as means of self-expression with different community groups for children and people with special needs. This type of non-formal education helps in ensuring active participation and teaches people to manage the community in which they live.

Youth and community organisations young people have the opportunity to discover, analyse and understand values and their implications and build a set of values to guide their lives. They run work camps and meetings, recruit volunteers, administer bank accounts, give counselling etc. to work toward social change.

Importance 

Education plays an important role in development. Out of school programmes are important to provide adaptable learning opportunities and new skills and knowledge to a large percentage of people who are beyond the reach of formal education. Non-formal education began to gain popularity in the late 1960s and early 1970s. Today, non-formal education is seen as a concept of recurrent and lifelong learning.

Non-formal education is popular among the adults specially the women as it increases women's participation in both private and public activities, i.e. in house hold decision making and as active citizens in the community affairs and national development. These literacy programmes have a dramatic impact on women's self-esteem because they unleash their potential in economic, social, cultural and political spheres.

According to UNESCO (2010), non-formal education helps to ensures equal access to education, eradicate illiteracy among women and improve women's access to vocational training, science, technology and continuing education. It also encourages the development of non-discriminatory education and training. The effectiveness of such literacy and non-formal education programmes are bolstered by family, community and parental involvement. This is why the United Nations Sustainable Development Goal 4 advocates for a diversification of learning opportunities and the usage of a wide range of education and training modalities in recognition of the importance of non-formal education.

Advantages 

Non-formal education is beneficial in a number of ways. There are activities that encourage young people to choose their own programme and projects that are important because they offer the youth the flexibility and freedom to explore their emerging interests. When the youth can choose the activities in which they can participate, they have opportunities to develop several skills like decision making skills. A distinction can be made between "participant functionality" and "societal functionality" of non-formal education. Participant functionality refers to the aimed advantages for the individual participants in non-formal education, while societal functionality refers to the benefits non-formal education has on society in general.

Non-formal learning has experiential learning activities that foster the development of skills and knowledge. This helps in building the confidence and abilities among the youth of today. It also helps in development of personal relationships not only among the youth but also among the adults. It helps in developing interpersonal skills among the young people as they learn to interact with peers outside the class and with adults in the community.

Necessity 

Formal education system are inadequate to effectively meet the needs of the individual and the society. The need to offer more and better education at all levels, to a growing number of people, particularly in developing countries, the scant success of current formal education systems to meet all such demands, has shown the need to develop alternatives to learning.

The rigid structure of formal schools, mainly because of rules and regulations than concentrating on the real need of the students, offering curriculum that leans away from the individual and from society, far more concerned with performing programmes than reaching useful objectives. This called for non-formal education which starting from the basic need of the students, is concerned with the establishment of strategies that are compatible with reality.

References

Sources

External links
OECD Recognition for Non-Formal and Informal Learning home
European Cultural Center for Non-formal education in Egypt
Directorate General for Education and Culture on Valuing learning outside formal education and training
Cedefop European guidelines for validating non-formal and informal learning - 2nd edition, 2015
Conclusions of The Council of the European Union May 2004
Department of Education, Education and Workplace Relations, Australia Government. Country Report

Applied learning